Glenville Lovell (born 1955) is a Barbadian writer, dancer, novelist and playwright.

Lovell was born in a Chattel house in Parish Land, Christ Church, Barbados and grew up around rich storytelling among the sugar cane workers.  His first novel, Fire in the Canes was published in 1995 and was met with critical acclaim.  So too was his second novel, Song of Night, published in 1998.

Lovell's work as a playwright earned him the 2002 Frank Collymore Literary Award for the Barbados-based Mango Ripe! Mango Sweet!.  Many of his novels and plays have represented Barbados at the Caribbean Festival of Arts.

External links and references

Official Glenville Lovell website

Barbadian novelists
Barbadian male writers
Male novelists
People from Christ Church, Barbados
Living people
1955 births